Alia Zuberi also known as Kumari Alia (Ms. Alia) is an Indian politician and ex-Member of Parliament from Uttar Pradesh. She has been the delegate of India under Govt of India's Haj Goodwill delegation for Saudi Arabia in 2005 and 2007. She has been elected member of the All India Congress Committee many times.

References 

Indian National Congress politicians
Indian Administrative Service officers
Living people
Lok Sabha members from Uttar Pradesh
Rajya Sabha members from Uttar Pradesh
Women in Uttar Pradesh politics
Women members of the Lok Sabha
1953 births
Indian National Congress politicians from Uttar Pradesh